Aminobacter is a genus of Gram-negative soil bacteria.

References

Phyllobacteriaceae
Bacteria genera